Hamad Al-Hamad (born 26 August 1987) is a Saudi Arabian professional footballer who currently plays as a winger for Al-Jubail. He is a former Saudi Arabia international having made his debut in 2012.

Career
Al-Hamad began his career at Ettifaq and made his debut in the 2008–09 season. On 7 February 2011, Al-Hamad joined Al-Taawoun until the end of the season. Upon his return to Al-Ettifaq, Al-Hamad was made a starter by new manager Branko Ivanković. He helped his side reach the final of the 2011–12 Crown Prince Cup and finish fourth in the Pro League. This meant that they had qualified for the 2013 AFC Champions League group stages. He also made nine appearances and scored once as Al-Ettifaq reached the semi-finals of the 2012 AFC Cup. On 7 April 2014, in the last round of the 2013–14 Pro League, Al-Ettifaq were relegated to the Saudi First Division for the first time in history following a 2–1 defeat to Al-Ahli.

Following Al-Ettifaq's relegation, Al-Hamad joined Al-Hilal on a five-year contract for a reported fee of 6 million SAR. After failing to make an impact with Al-Hilal, Al-Hamad was loaned out to Al-Raed on 21 August 2015. On 16 August 2016, Al-Hamad was released by Al-Hilal. On 7 November 2016, Al-Hamad joined Al-Fateh on a one-year contract. His contract was not renewed at the end of the season and he was released by the club.

After a year without a club, Al-Hamad joined fourth-tier side Al-Safa. He helped the side gain promotion to the Saudi Second Division and win the Saudi Third Division title. On 21 August 2019, Al-Hamad joined Second Division side Hajer. He made 21 appearances and scored four times as Hajer won the Second Division title and gained promotion to the MS League.

Career statistics

Club

Honours
Al-Hilal
King Cup: 2015

Al-Safa
Saudi Third Division: 2018–19

Hajer
Saudi Second Division: 2019–20

References

1987 births
Living people
Saudi Arabian footballers
Ettifaq FC players
Al-Taawoun FC players
Al Hilal SFC players
Al-Raed FC players
Al-Fateh SC players
Al Safa FC players
Hajer FC players
Al-Thoqbah Club players
Al-Jubail Club players
Association football forwards
Saudi Arabia international footballers
Saudi Professional League players
Saudi Second Division players
Saudi Fourth Division players
Saudi First Division League players
Saudi Third Division players